Harriet Jane Shetler (August 1, 1917 – March 30, 2010) was a founder of the National Alliance on Mental Illness.

Shetler was born Harriet Jane McCown in Leechburg, Pennsylvania. She graduated from Monmouth College (Illinois) in 1938 and worked in the newspaper and publishing business. She married Charles Shetler (1918–2010) in 1943. 

Together with Beverly Young, Shetler founded what became the National Alliance on Mental Illness in Madison, Wisconsin in 1977. 

She retired in 1982. Shetler died in Madison, Wisconsin.

References

People from Armstrong County, Pennsylvania
Writers from Madison, Wisconsin
1917 births
2010 deaths